La Voluntad del Muerto is a Spanish-language version of The Cat Creeps (1930), both of which are now considered to be lost films.

The film was directed by George Melford and stars Antonio Moreno, Lupita Tovar, Andrés de Segurola, Roberto E. Guzmán, Paul Ellis, Lucio Villegas, Agostino Borgato, Conchita Ballesteros, María Calvo, and Soledad Jiménez.

A premiere gala was held for the film at Los Angeles' California Theatre on January 23, 1931.

References

External links

La Voluntad del muerto at the Internet Movie Database

1930 films
1930s Spanish-language films
Spanish-language American films
American mystery films
American black-and-white films
American crime thriller films
Films directed by George Melford
American multilingual films
Remakes of American films
Sound film remakes of silent films
Universal Pictures films
Lost American films
1930 multilingual films
1930 lost films
1930s American films